The 2005 New Zealand rugby union tour of Britain and Ireland was a Grand Slam rugby union tour played by the New Zealand national rugby union team, also known as the All Blacks, in the United Kingdom and in the Republic of Ireland against their respective national teams. Played through November, it consisted of 4 matches against Wales, Ireland, England and Scotland.

It was the first Grand Slam Tour by the All Blacks since the 18 match Grand Slam tour of 1978.

New Zealand won all matches with a touring squad of 35 players selected by Head Coach Graham Henry. The first against Wales on 5 November, then against Ireland on 12 November, England on 19 November and finally Scotland on 26 November to complete the first successful Grand Slam tour of the professional era. The last successful Grand Slam was by Australia in 1984 in between 14 other matches.

Touring squad
A total of 35 players were selected for the touring squad: five props, three hookers, four locks, seven loose forwards, three halfbacks, seven midfielders and six back three-quarters, including five new caps. Graham Henry was Head Coach with Wayne Smith and Steve Hansen as his Assistant Coaches. Tana Umaga was named captain for the tour.

Tests
A total of four matches were played during the 2005 Grand Slam tour against the four home unions of Wales, Ireland, England and Scotland. The tour was played over four weeks, with one game each week.

Wales
Wales were looking to beat the All Blacks for the first time since 1953, when they won 13–8 at Cardiff Arms Park. They came into the match and tour as the most recent Six Nations champions and the last of the Home Nations to agree to play the All Blacks on the 2005 tour. New Zealand came in after a successful British & Irish Lions tour and another Tri Nations win.

The All Black coaching staff named three debutantes for the first test in Cardiff: Neemia Tialata and Chris Masoe were chosen ahead of regular starters Tony Woodcock and Richie McCaw, while Angus MacDonald came on for James Ryan for his first international.

Match summary

The All Blacks started off their tour with a 41 – 3 victory over Wales in Cardiff on 5 November, the 100th anniversary of rugby between the two teams. Dan Carter was the standout player for New Zealand, scoring 26 points including two of the five tries by the visitors. Rico Gear scored the other three tries for his team. Wales took another loss to the All Blacks, having to wait another year until they could break their losing streak against them, winning 13 - 8

First half
Both sides started the game a bit rusty but the All Blacks quickly took control of the ball and position on the field, depleting the Welsh team of a chance at attack.

New Zealand struck first with an early penalty before Byron Kelleher lost the first chance for a try in the 16th minute of play. The halfback took a quick tap at halfway, running 45 metres through a gap before getting tackled downfield, failing to offload to the open Tana Umaga at his shoulder. Carter converted to be two from two and put the All Blacks out in front 6–0.

Wales also missed a chance for a try that had to be substituted for penalty because of poor play. Gareth Thomas made it happen with a nice break through a missed tackle to set up a ruck inside the All Blacks' 22-metre line. With players wide, an easy catch and pass game would have got them the try they needed but poor ball handling ended up with the penalty being called instead. First-five Stephen Jones converted it into points and decreased the deficit to a penalty's-worth, 3 points.

Rico Gear scored the only try of the first half after some nice all round All Black play. With the scores at 6–3 in favour of the visitors, Chris Jack took the ball from the line-out in Welsh territory and provided the ball to the backs. Umaga straightened and feed back to Carter who spread it to Mils Muliaina, it was an easy pass out to Gear after that who scored in the right hand corner. Carter converted the sideline conversion and put the All Blacks out to 13.

Wales gained confidence as the first half progressed but the Rico Gear try in the corner nine minutes from the half-time break gave the All Blacks the upper hand going into the second half.

Second half
The All Blacks showed no signs of slowing down when they came out and scored two converted tries in the first ten minutes, both from Gear. Gear scored his second, set up by Carter, and third in the same corner as his first; his second came from a nice pass from Carter who put him through the gap and it was an easy run to the try line, while his third was as simple as his first two with some easy passing out wide where Gear got outside his man and scored another five-pointer. Carter converted and New Zealand secured the win with still half an hour to play with a 27–3 lead.

With the game all but over, both sides shifted down a few gears with scrappy play dominating much of the final half-hour. However, New Zealand were the ones who capitalised on it, when they scored their fourth try of the game, coming from a dominant play by Carter who broke an easy tackle and cruised down the line to score his 17th and, after the conversion, 19th points of the match. Yet, he wasn't finished, in the final minute of play Conrad Smith put a kick through for Umaga; Umaga won the race to the ball but went down with his challenger and popped the ball up to a supporting Carter who went in for his second try and then his fifth conversion of the night.

Carter finished with 26 of the team's 41 points and the All Blacks started off their tour on the highest possible note.

Scoring summary
1st half
 NZ – Dan Carter penalty goal. Score: New Zealand 3 – 0
 NZ – Dan Carter penalty goal. Score: New Zealand 6 – 0
 WAL – Stephen Jones penalty goal. Score: New Zealand 6 – 3
 NZ – Rico Gear try, conversion successful (Dan Carter). Score: New Zealand 13 – 3
2nd half
 NZ – Rico Gear try, conversion successful (Dan Carter). Score: New Zealand 20 – 3
 NZ – Rico Gear try, conversion successful (Dan Carter). Score: New Zealand 27 – 3
 NZ – Dan Carter try, conversion successful (Dan Carter). Score: New Zealand 34 – 3
 NZ – Dan Carter try, conversion successful (Dan Carter). Score: New Zealand 41 – 3
Final:  New Zealand 41 – 3  Wales

Player movement
Both teams utilised all of their replacement players, bringing them on at some point during the match. Richie McCaw and Tony Woodcock were the two usual starters on the bench making room for run-on debutantes Neemia Tialata and Chris Masoe, while Angus MacDonald made his debut off the bench.

New Zealand

Wales

Ireland
Ireland were looking for their first win over the All Blacks throughout the history of rugby between them. The closest they had come was a 10–10 draw in 1973 at Lansdowne Road.

The All Black coaches named a completely different squad than their team that played against Wales with loose forward Sione Lauaki and prop John Afoa making their debuts. Afoa was selected in the initial squad for the Tri Nations earlier in the year but had to wait until the 2005 end-of-year tour before he got on the field. Richie McCaw was named captain while regular captain Tana Umaga was rested. They also named five forward replacements and only two back replacements.

Match summary

The All Blacks' second test was as good as their first with good win over Ireland on 12 November. The score would have been a shutout, but a late try by Marcus Horan left the full-time score at 45–7. Two tries each to wingers Sitiveni Sivivatu and Doug Howlett and another 20 points contributed by Nick Evans helped the All Blacks to a perfect 2–0 start to their Grand Slam tour.

First half
Ireland struggled in the first ten minutes, unable to get out of their own half from the pressure the All Blacks applied. The result was inevitable as Sitiveni Sivivatu broke a tackle and scored the first try of the match in the ninth minute of play. Nick Evans converted and the All Blacks were up 7–0.

As possession switched between teams, New Zealand were the first to do something with it when stand-in captain Richie McCaw offloaded to busy halfback Piri Weepu for their second try. Evans missed the conversion, but a penalty five minutes later brought the All Blacks up to 15–0 26 minutes in.

With another penalty in the 35th minute, New Zealand gained a chance at a counter-attack off a kick from Ronan O'Gara that failed to clear the touchline. New Zealand soaked up the Irish pressure and gained possession, No. 8 Mose Tuiali'i broke down the right hand line, passed to Leon MacDonald who fed Sivivatu for his second and New Zealand's third. Evans converted and New Zealand went into half-time with a 25–0 advantage.

Second half
New Zealand started where they finished off in the second half with Ireland trying to perform better than their poor first half when Nick Evans kicked two penalties in the first eight minutes from some disappointing play from the home side.

A dangerous tackle by Ma'a Nonu on Gordon D'Arcy brought memories of the Tana Umaga "spear tackle" on Brian O'Driscoll in the 2005 British & Irish Lions tour and he was lucky to leave with just a warning.

Five minutes after the tackle, winger Doug Howlett got the wide ball and scored what looked like New Zealand's fourth try of the night, but referee Jonathan Kaplan referred to the television match official and awarded Ireland a line-out instead, after it was determined his leg was out of bounds before the ball was grounded in goal. Ma'a Nonu was also called back after he knocked the ball on over the line. Howlett gained what he thought he had five minutes later with the first of his tries as the All Blacks spread it wide beyond Ireland's capacity, Evans converted and New Zealand were up 28–0.

Ten minutes from full-time Ireland took a quick tap and Shane Horgan scrambled over the line but was unable to ground the ball and they were awarded a penalty five metres out. Four minutes later, when the game was all but over, Howlett prospered from another period of prolonged New Zealand pressure and claimed his second try of the afternoon. Another conversion followed, and New Zealand were up by 45 points.

Ireland finally got on the board two minutes from full-time when Marcus Horan crossed the line from an Irish maul. David Humphreys converted, and the Irish left without the embarrassment of a whitewash.

New Zealand finished the game with a dominant performance, not letting Ireland in until the last minute, racking up their second win of the tour and halfway to their first Grand Slam tour since 1978.

Scoring summary
1st half
 NZ – Sitiveni Sivivatu try, conversion successful (Nick Evans). Score: New Zealand 7 – 0
 NZ – Piri Weepu try, conversion unsuccessful. Score: New Zealand 12 – 0
 NZ – Nick Evans penalty goal. Score: New Zealand 15 – 0
 NZ – Nick Evans penalty goal. Score: New Zealand 18 – 0
 NZ – Sitiveni Sivivatu try, conversion successful (Nick Evans). Score: New Zealand 25 – 0
2nd half
 NZ – Nick Evans penalty goal. Score: New Zealand 28 – 0
 NZ – Nick Evans penalty goal. Score: New Zealand 31 – 0
 NZ – Doug Howlett try, conversion successful (Nick Evans). Score: New Zealand 38 – 0
 NZ – Doug Howlett try, conversion successful (Nick Evans). Score: New Zealand 45 – 0
 IRE – Marcus Horan try, conversion successful (Ronan O'Gara). Score: New Zealand 45 – 7
Final:  New Zealand 45 – 7  Ireland

Player movement
New Zealand used four of their possible seven substitutes, with Saimone Taumoepeau coming on to have his first run-out of the tour. Ireland used six of their subs during the game, with only Kieran Campbell not being used.

New Zealand

Ireland

England
England provided the toughest challenge yet with only four points separating the teams at the final whistle. England were the most recent team of the four 2005 opponents to beat the All Blacks with a 15–13 victory in 2003 at Westpac Stadium in Wellington.

New Zealand named the best team possible for the game with only seven of the players staying on from the last test against Ireland. Richie McCaw was a late replacement after copping a head knock in the previous test, he was replaced by Chris Masoe. It was marked and remembered by the three yellow cards referee Alan Lewis delivered to the All Blacks, who at one time were down to 13 men.

Along with Wales, England were celebrating 100 years of test rugby against the All Blacks, first playing on 12 February 1905.

Match summary

Staunch defence was a major factor in New Zealand's 23–19 win over England on 19 November in front of capacity crowd at a Twickenham Stadium going through a few developments. With 14 men for the better part of the second half, New Zealand kept the home team to just one try, running in two of their own and a total of 10 successful kicks at goal completing the scoring.

First half
England dominated the early stages of the game, captain Martin Corry running in the first try five minutes in. New Zealand were penalised in their desperation to recover, and England opted for the line-out which got them to the All Blacks' 22-metre line. They completed the line-out and from the ensuing maul the home team scored their first and only try of the match. Charlie Hodgson converted the sideline conversion and the Twickenham crowd settled down to see how the All Blacks would respond.

As the two teams battled for supremacy in all areas it took five-eight Daniel Carter to make the break. Through a weak tackle by Corry on his own 22-metre line, Carter had a two-on-one. He managed to offload to his captain, Tana Umaga, who scored under the posts. Carter converted and the scores were equal 20 minutes in.

After some tremendous defence from both teams, a penalty goal each saw the score move to 10–10 in which was an intensely fought battle, evident in the scrums where England, dominant in their match against Australia a week ago, were being given a much tougher test.

Another penalty by Carter after one missed by Hodgson left the All Blacks with a 13–10 advantage going into halftime after a tough, fast first half.

Second half
New Zealand were immediately on the front foot five minutes after the restart with Daniel Carter making another break which set up a platform for Keven Mealamu to barrel over. With the conversion successful, New Zealand were out to a 10-point lead early on.

Another penalty each, and the score at 23–13, England sustained enough forward pressure to force Tony Woodcock to commit a yellow card offence in the 57th minute. England responded successfully with two penalties to Hodgson from some nice line-out and driving work by the forwards. The lead was knocked down to four points with a quarter of an hour left in the match with New Zealand still with 14 men.

A couple of minutes before Woodcock was due to return, the replacement prop, Neemia Tialata, was sin-binned and, for a short while, New Zealand were down to 13 men.

England were still unable to score any points though and with both sin-binned players returning, it looked like the All Blacks would be able to hold out for the last four minutes. However, with England threatening on attack, Chris Masoe was penalised for intentionally killing the ball and was shown the yellow card, giving the home team a shot at the win.

Despite the player advantage, England could not create the opportunity to score the try needed for the victory, and New Zealand escaped with their toughest win of the tour.

Scoring summary
1st half
 ENG – Martin Corry try, conversion successful (Charlie Hodgson). Score: England 7 – 0
NZ – Tana Umaga try, conversion successful (Dan Carter). Score: New Zealand 7 – 7
 ENG – Charlie Hodgson penalty goal. Score: England 10 – 7
 NZ – Dan Carter penalty goal. Score: New Zealand 10 – 10
 NZ – Dan Carter penalty goal. Score: New Zealand 13 – 10
2nd half
NZ – Keven Mealamu try, conversion successful (Dan Carter). Score: New Zealand 20 – 10
 ENG – Charlie Hodgson penalty goal. Score: New Zealand 20 – 13
 NZ – Dan Carter penalty goal. Score: New Zealand 23 – 13
 ENG – Charlie Hodgson penalty goal. Score: New Zealand 23 – 16
 ENG – Charlie Hodgson penalty goal. Score: New Zealand 23 – 19
Final:  New Zealand 23 – 19  England

Player movement
New Zealand received three yellow cards throughout the game, and were reduced to 13 men at one point. They also utilised all of their replacements except Andrew Hore. England only used one of their seven substitutes, with Matt Stevens coming on for Andrew Sheridan in the 74th minute.

New Zealand

England

Scotland

References

External links
 2005 Tour in detail

2005
2005
2005
2005
2005
Tour
2005 rugby union tours
2005–06 in Irish rugby union
2005–06 in English rugby union
2005–06 in Welsh rugby union
2005–06 in Scottish rugby union
2005–06 in European rugby union
2005–06 in British rugby union